Yeon Woo is a South Korea and Indonesian pop singer signed to MBC. In 1999, she and four other Korean singers formed girl group T.T.MA, in which she used the stage name Yu Jin. After their 2002 breakup, which she later stated that she regretted, she temporarily left the music industry. In 2007, she made a comeback with a new image and released a solo album Dan Harureul Salado; the digital version ranked #1 for number of registered downloads in June of that year. In August, she then released the album Season in the Sun, a remake of a Japanese album. In April 2008, she released her first album: "Yeon Woo 1st". In 2018 she was married to Lance Matthew Reyna.

Discography
단 하루를 살아도 (Dan Harureul Salado; digital single, released 2007-05-21)
단 하루를 살아도 (RR: "Dan Harureul Salado"; Eng.: "Even if I only live one day")
나도 여자인가 봐 (RR: "Nado Yeojainga Bwa"; Eng.: "See that I'm also a woman")
단 하루를 살아도 (RR: "Dan Harureul Salado"; instrumental)
나도 여자인가 봐 (RR: "Nado Yeojainga Bwa"; instrumental)

Season in the Sun (released 2007-08-27)
Season In The Sun
Season In The Sun (Club Mix)
Season In The Sun (Instrumental)
Season In The Sun (Club Mix, instrumental)

Yeon Woo 1st (released 2008-04-17)
The Bridges Of Madison County
사랑은 시간 속에 남아 	
Darling
Season In The Sun (J-pop Version)
그대만 (Featuring 소이)
No Life Without You (Featuring 소설)
단 하루를 살아도
In Memory
사랑은 시간 속에 남아 (Instrumental)
Darling (Instrumental)
I Wish A Merry Christmas! (From. 소이)
메리메리 - T.T.Ma (티티마)

References

1981 births
K-pop singers
Living people
South Korean women pop singers
21st-century South Korean singers
21st-century South Korean women singers